The Wellington Rugby League Team (also known as the Wellington Orcas) are a rugby league team that represents the Wellington Rugby League in New Zealand Rugby League competitions. They currently compete in the National Competition.

History

1908–1988: Early years
Wellington played its first game on 24 August 1908 when they took on Auckland at Victoria Park, Auckland in the first provincial game of rugby league in New Zealand.

The following All Golds played for Wellington in that first match: Edward Tyne, Hercules Richard Wright, Tom Cross, Conrad Byrne, Daniel Gilchrist, Daniel Fraser and James Barber.

During 1909, 1910 and 1911 Wellington continued to play a number of provincial games, and in 1909 defeated Auckland, in Auckland 22–19, the first of only five victories over Auckland in over 100 years.

In 1912 Wellington played in its first international match, losing to the touring New South Wales side, 45–13.

They defeated Auckland 33–18 on 27 September 1913. It was not until 1988 that they were again victorious over an Auckland side. The 1913 side was: A.Anderson, B.Whitley, W.Kelly, A.House (Petone), G.Bradley (Athletic), K.George, J.Barber, Jim Parker (Petone), J.Spencer, T.Turner, A.Bensmann, L.Campbell (Newtown), W.Wilson (Athletic). Bench: H.McGuire, B.Childs.

During the 1951 French rugby league tour of Australasia the Wellington side hosted a match against the tourists.

During the 1988 Great Britain Lions tour, Wellington were defeated by the Britons 18 – 24 at Porirua Park before a crowd of 4,428.

1989–1990: Rugby League Cup
On several occasions Wellington has held the Rugby League Cup (previously known as the Northern Union Cup 1910–1969) for interprovincial competition played on a challenge basis. Wellington won it off the West Coast in 1947 for the first time and held it for three years. Wellington held it last in 1990.

1990–1994: Great Britain Tour
In 1990 Wellington defeated the touring Great Britain side 30–22. This was Wellington's first, and to date only, win over a touring side.

1994–1996: Lion Red Cup
Between 1994 and 1996, Wellington was represented by the Wellington City Dukes and Hutt Valley Firehawks in the Lion Red Cup. One player from the Dukes, Earl Va'a, later went on to represent Samoa in Rugby union. Both teams folded along with the competition in 1996.

2002–2007: Bartercard Cup

In 2000 and 2001 the region was represented in the Bartercard Cup by the Porirua Pumas and Wainuiomata Lions. However, in 2002 it was decided that one team was needed in the competition. They narrowly missed out on a finals spot in 2002, being on equal points but with a lower For and Against than the Marist Richmond Brothers. Unfortunately this was a high point for the franchise with the team never making the play-offs.

The Orca nickname was adopted for the 2006 season, adopting the name from the Southern Orcas consortium – a group attempting to gain an expansion National Rugby League competition licence that was instead granted to the Gold Coast Titans group. Previously they were known as Wellington Franchise.

Notable players included Ben Matulino and Simon Mannering.

*Wellington were docked three points for registration infringements.

2008–2009: Bartercard Premiership

Wellington Rugby League were awarded a place in the new six-team National Provincial Competition. The team plays its home matches at Porirua Park.

2010–present: NZRL National Competition
Wellington was put in the NZRL National Competition after the Bartercard Premiership disbanded. Wellington were called the "Wellington Orcas" through the competition.

References

New Zealand rugby league teams
Orcas
1908 establishments in New Zealand